The following is the list of squads that took place in the men's field hockey tournament at the 1972 Summer Olympics.

Argentina
The following players represented Argentina:

 Ernesto Barreiros
 Fernando Calp
 Julio César Cufre
 Flavio de Giacomi
 Gerardo Lorenzo
 Héctor Marinoni
 Osvaldo Monti
 Jorge Piccioli
 Daniel Portugués
 Alfredo Quaquarini
 Horacio Rognoni
 Julio Segolini
 Alberto Sabbione
 Jorge Sabbione
 Gabriel Scally
 Ovidio Sodor

Australia
The following players represented Australia:

 Brian Glencross
 Robert Haigh
 Robert Andrew
 Greg Browning
 Ric Charlesworth
 Paul Dearing
 Tom Golder
 Wayne Hammond
 James Mason
 Terry McAskell
 Patrick Nilan
 Desmond Piper
 Graeme Reid
 Ronald Riley
 Donald Smart
 Ronald Wilson

Belgium
The following players represented Belgium:

 Jean-Marie Buisset
 Carl-Eric Vanderborght
 Marc Legros
 Eric Stoupel
 Charly Bouvy
 Michel De Saedeleer
 Patrick Gillard
 Daniel Dupont
 Jean-Claude Moraux
 Jean-François Gilles
 Philippe Collin
 Jean Toussaint
 Raoul Ronsmans
 Armand Solie
 Michel Deville
 Guy Miserque
 Jean-André Zembsch

France
The following players represented France:

 Jean-Paul Sauthier
 Gilles Capelle
 Patrick Burtschell
 Pierre Roussel
 Georges Corbel
 Charles Pous
 Marc Chapon
 Christian Honneger
 Marc Remise
 Olivier Moreau
 Georges Grain
 Francis Coutou
 Erick Pitau
 Yves Langlois
 Thierry Havet
 Jean-Luc Darfeuille
 Alain Tétard

Great Britain
The following players represented Great Britain:

 Austin Savage
 Peter Mills
 Paul Svehlik
 Rui Saldanha
 Tony Ekins
 Keith Sinclair
 Bernie Cotton
 Joe Ahmad
 Dennis Hay
 Richard Oliver
 Michael Crowe
 Terry Gregg
 Michael Corby
 Graham Evans
 John French
 Christopher Langhorne
 Peter Marsh

India
The following players represented India:

 Manuel Frederick
 Mukhbain Singh
 Michael Kindo
 Varinder Singh
 Ajitpal Singh
 Harmik Singh
 Ganesh Mollerapoovayya
 Harbinder Singh
 Kulwant Singh
 Ashok Kumar
 Harcharan Singh
 Charles Cornelius
 Krishnamurty Perumal
 Govinda Billimogaputtaswamy
 Victor Philips
 Vece Paes

Kenya
The following players represented Kenya:

 Amarjeet Singh Marwa
 Jagmel Singh Rooprai
 Avtar Singh Sohal
 Harvinder Singh Marwa
 Surjeet Singh Rihal
 Resham Singh Baines
 Jagjeet Singh Kular
 Davinder Singh Deegan
 Leo Fernandes
 Brajinder Singh Daved
 Tarlochan Singh Chana
 Philip D'Souza
 Surjeet Singh Panesar
 Mohamed Ajmal Malik
 Harvinder Pal Singh Sibia
 Renny Pereira
 Silvester Ashioya
 Ranjit Singh Sehmi

Malaysia
The following players represented Malaysia:

 Khair-ud-Din bin Zainal
 Francis Belavantheran
 Sri Shanmuganathan
 Brian Santa Maria
 Phang Poh Meng
 Wong Choon Hin
 Balasingam Singaram
 Sayed Samat
 Sulaiman Saibot
 Franco De Cruz
 Murugesan Mahendran
 Harnahal Singh Sewa
 Yang Siow Ming
 Omar Mohamed Razali Yeop
 Ramalingam Pathmarajah

Mexico
The following players represented Mexico:

 David Sevilla
 Noel Gutiérrez
 Orlando Ventura
 Javier Varela
 Manuel Fernández
 Héctor Ventura
 José Miguel Huacuja
 Oscar Huacuja
 Adán Noriega
 José María Mascaro
 Francisco Ramírez
 Enrique Filoteo
 Víctor Contreras
 Rubén Vasconcelos
 José Luis Partida
 Manuel Noriega
 Juan Calderón

Netherlands
The following players represented the Netherlands:

 André Bolhuis
 Marinus Dijkerman
 Thijs Kaanders
 Coen Kranenberg
 Ties Kruize
 Wouter Leefers
 Flip van Lidth le Jeude
 Paul Litjens
 Irving van Nes
 Maarten Sikking
 Frans Spits
 Nico Spits
 Bart Taminiau
 Kik Thole
 Piet Weemers
 Jeroen Zweerts

New Zealand
The following players represented New Zealand:

 Jeff Archibald
 Thur Borren
 Jan Borren
 John Christensen
 Greg Dayman
 Chris Ineson
 Ross McPherson
 Barry Maister
 Selwyn Maister
 Arthur Parkin
 Ramesh Patel
 Alan Patterson
 Kevin Rigby
 Ted Salmon
 Warwick Wright

Pakistan
The following players represented Pakistan:

 Salim Sherwani
 Munawwaruz Zaman
 Saeed Anwar
 Akhtar Rasool
 Fazalur Rehman
 Mudassar Asghar
 Islah-ud-Din
 Abdul Rashid
 Muhammad Asad Malik
 Shahnaz Sheikh
 Akhtarul Islam
 Riaz Ahmed
 Iftikhar Ahmed Syed
 Muhammad Zahid Sheikh
 Jahangir Butt

Poland
The following players represented Poland:

 Zbigniew Łój
 Ryszard Twardowski
 Stefan Otulakowski
 Zbigniew Juszczak
 Witold Ziaja
 Stanisław Kaźmierczak
 Jerzy Choroba
 Aleksander Wrona
 Henryk Grotowski
 Józef Wybieralski
 Włodzimierz Matuszyński
 Aleksander Ciążyński
 Marek Kruś
 Stanisław Kasprzyk
 Jerzy Czajka
 Bolesław Czaiński
 Stefan Wegnerski

Spain
The following players represented Spain:

 Luis Carrera
 Antonio Nogués
 Francisco Segura
 Juan Amat
 Francisco Fábregas
 José Alustiza
 Jaime Arbós
 Jorge Fábregas
 Francisco Amat
 José Sallés
 Ramón Quintana
 Jorge Camiña
 Agustín Churruca
 Juan Arbós
 Juan Quintana
 Luis Antonio Twose
 José Borrell
 Jaime Amat

Uganda
The following players represented Uganda:

 Elly Kitamireke
 Joseph Kagimu
 Ajaip Singh Matharu
 George Moraes
 Herbert Kajumba
 Willie Lobo
 Jagdish Singh Kapoor
 Upkar Singh Kapoor
 Rajinder Singh Sandhu
 Kuldip Singh Bhogal
 Ajit Singh Bhogal
 Malkit Singh Sondh
 Amarjit Singh Sandhu
 Avtar Singh Bhurji
 Polycarp Pereira
 Isaac Chirwa
 Paul Adiga

West Germany
The following players represented West Germany:

 Wolfgang Rott
 Peter Kraus
 Michael Peter
 Dieter Freise
 Fritz Schmidt
 Michael Krause
 Horst Dröse
 Werner Kaessmann
 Uli Vos
 Carsten Keller
 Peter Trump
 Wolfgang Baumgart
 Wolfgang Strödter
 Eduard Thelen
 Rainer Seifert
 Detlev Kittstein
 Eckardt Suhl
 Ulrich Klaes

References

1972